The Serenade No. 12 for winds in C minor, K. 388/384a, was written by Wolfgang Amadeus Mozart in 1782 or 1783. The work is sometimes called "Nachtmusik". In 1787, Mozart transcribed the work for string quintet. This transcription survives as String Quintet, K. 406/516b.

Instrumentation

The serenade is scored for 2 oboes, 2 clarinets, 2 horns, and 2 bassoons.

Structure

There are four movements:

Allegro, C minor, sonata form
Andante, E-flat major, sonata form
Menuet & Trio, C minor, Trio in C major, ternary form
Allegro, C minor, ends in C major, variation form with the fifth variation (in E-flat major) augmented.

The minuet is a canon. The oboes carry the melody with the bassoons answering one bar later. The trio is also canonic with the response to the melody played upside down. The finale is a set of variations containing a central episode in E-flat major and a coda that turns to C major near the end.

References

External links

Serenade 12
Compositions in C minor
1782 compositions
1783 compositions